Gu Zhongchen (Hepburn: Ko Chōchin; 1860 – July 31, 1945) was a military leader and politician at the end of Qing dynasty and in the early Republic of China. His courtesy name was Yangwu.

Biography 
Gu Zhongchen was born in Wuxi, Jiangsu. By the end of the Qing dynasty, he was Commandant of the Anhui Military Academy. However, a number of his cadets, including Bai Wenwei, entered the pro-republican Tongmenghui movement, so he came under suspicion by imperial authorities and was demoted to a trifling job in Nanjing. During the Xinhai Revolution of 1911 that overthrew the Qing dynasty, Gu Zhongchen participated with the Tongmenghui as the General Councilor of the Jiangsu–Zhejiang United Army. In May 1924, he was appointed to the Commander of the 4th Army of the Northern Expedition Force commanded by Sun Yat-sen.

In March 1940, Gu Zhongchen was appointed to the Vice-Chief of the Examination Yuan within the collaborationist Reorganized National Government of China under Wang Jingwei. In November 1944, he promoted to the Chief of the Examination Yuan.

Gu Zhongchen died on July 31, 1945, at the age of 86.

References 

 
 
 

Politicians from Wuxi
Republic of China politicians from Jiangsu
Military personnel of the Republic of China
Chinese collaborators with Imperial Japan
Kuomintang collaborators with Imperial Japan
1860 births
1945 deaths
Presidents of the Examination Yuan